The 2016 League of Ireland Cup Final was the final match of the 2016 League of Ireland Cup, played between Limerick and defending champions St Patrick's Athletic. The match was played on 17 September 2016 at 5.30 pm. Limerick's route to the final involved them beating fellow First Division side Cobh Ramblers, before beating Premier Division sides Wexford Youths, Galway United and Derry City. St Pat's however were drawn away from home in every round as they knocked out Dundalk, Bray Wanderers and Shamrock Rovers en route to the final. Limerick lead at half time thanks to a terrific Lee Lynch strike but Pats hit back in the second half and equalised through Christy Fagan 20 minutes into the half. The game had a dramatic final 6 minutes as the Saints scored 3 goals through Conan Byrne, Jamie McGrath and Graham Kelly to retain the trophy.

Match

See also
 2016 FAI Cup
 2016 League of Ireland
 2016 League of Ireland Cup

References

League of Ireland Cup finals
League Cup Final
League Of Ireland Cup Final 2016
Cup
League Of Ireland Cup Final 2016